The Virginia Department of Agriculture and Consumer Services (VDACS) is an agency of the Commonwealth of Virginia that is responsible for promoting the economic growth and development of Virginia's agricultural sector. It also provides environmental protection services and consumer protection programs.

The department is supervised and directed by the Commissioner of Agriculture and Consumer Services. The current Commissioner is Joseph W. Guthrie, who was appointed on January 15, 2022. He is Virginia's 18th Commissioner of Agriculture and Consumer Services. Guthrie is a sixth generation Virginia farmer, who owned and operated a beef cattle and hay farm in Pulaski County on farmland that has been in his family since 1795. Since 2007, he served as a Senior Instructor at Virginia Tech and taught courses in business management, finance, communications, and leadership in the Agricultural Technology Program.

Prior to his appointment, he served the residents of Pulaski County on the Board of Supervisors since 2015, and was elected board chair in 2020 and 2021. He was also elected to a four-year term on the Pulaski County School Board in 2011. Guthrie has served as the president of Virginia Tech's College of Agriculture and Life Sciences Faculty Association, president of Pulaski County Farm Bureau, and president of the Virginia Cattlemen's Association. He was appointed by USDA Secretary Tom Vilsack to the National Cattlemen's Beef Promotion and Research Board and was appointed by former Governor Bob McDonnell to the Virginia Cattle Industry Board.

Organization
The department is under the direction and supervision of a Commissioner of Agriculture and Consumer Services, who is appointed by the Governor of Virginia. The department is located within the Governor's Secretariat of Agriculture and Forestry, which is under the direction of the Governor's Cabinet Secretary of Agriculture and Forestry.

Commissioner of Agriculture and Consumer Services
Deputy Commissioner
Animal and Food Industry Services Division
Consumer Services Division
Marketing and Development Division
Commodity Services Division

See also
United States Department of Agriculture

References

External links
Virginia Department of Agriculture and Consumer Services homepage

Agriculture, Department of
State departments of agriculture of the United States
State environmental protection agencies of the United States